The CAF Confederation Cup is a seasonal association football competition run by the Confederation of African Football. It is the second club football competition in the continent behind the CAF Champions League. It was established in 2004.

List of finals

 The "Year" column refers to the season the competition was held, and wikilinks to the article about that season.
 Finals are listed in the order they were played.

Performances

By Club

By Nation

Notes & references

Notes

References

External links
CAF Confederation Cup on RSSSF

finals
Lists of association football matches